Ricardo Lloyd Powell (born 16 December 1978) is a former Jamaican cricketer who played for West Indies at international level. He represented Jamaica national cricket team as well as Trinidad and Tobago national cricket team from 1997 to 2005.

Domestic career 

Powell was 19 when he made his first-class debut in the 1996–96 season and followed it up with a List A debut in the following year in 1998–99 season.

Powell moved from Jamaica in 2003 to his wife's native country of Trinidad. Powell took a hiatus from the game after his wife was diagnosed with breast cancer. He made his Twenty20 debut at Stanford Cricket Ground in Coolidge, Antigua when Trinidad and Tobago national cricket team played against Cayman Islands national cricket team in Stanford 20/20.

International career 

He was the youngest West Indian to score an ODI century. He made 2,000 ODI runs at a strike rate of 96.66, which is the highest strike rate of a West Indian player with more than 1000 ODI runs and he also emulated Gordon Greenidge by hitting 8 sixes in an ODI innings against India cricket team  in 1999 at Singapore which was a West Indian ODI record.

He also hit seven sixes in another ODI against India cricket team at Toronto that same year. In total, he hit 75 sixes in 100 ODI innings, a ratio equal to that of Viv Richards. Such stunning performances from the 20-year-old led to comparisons with the great Viv Richards but for some reason the selectors seemed to pigeon-hole him as a One Day player, and he found himself in and out of the side, and being shunted up and down the batting order.

He played 109 One Day matches for the West Indies cricket team and 2 Tests matches in his career against New Zealand cricket team in 1999 and England cricket team in 2004 in which Brian Lara became first batsman to score 400 runs in Test cricket.

US career 

He played the game professionally and resides in the United States where he played cricket with the Indian Lions Cricket Club and works as a Cricket Analyst with ESPN.

In June 2016, Powell was named as new chairman of USA selection panel. The panel includes Asif Mujtaba, Michael Voss, Amer Afzaluddin and Barney Jones. His first assignment is to select USA senior men's for ICC World Cricket League Division Four which will be hosted Los Angeles as well as Under-17 squads. In June 2021, he was selected to take part in the Minor League Cricket tournament in the United States following the players' draft.

Personal life 
He is married to Caribbean TV Talk show host, blogger and international chef Alicia Basila Powell. The couple have three children, daughter, Ricole Powell, and two sons, Ricardo Powell Jr and Ross Powell. They all now reside in Atlanta, Georgia, in the United States of America

References

External links

1978 births
Living people
Jamaican cricketers
West Indies One Day International cricketers
West Indies Test cricketers
Trinidad and Tobago cricketers
Jamaica cricketers
Jamaican cricket coaches
People from Saint Elizabeth Parish